Planning Policy Statement 10: Planning for Sustainable Waste Management commonly abbreviated as PPS 10, is a document produced by the British Government and forms part of the national waste management plan for the United Kingdom. The current version was introduced in July 2005 and replaced Revised PPG 10: Planning and Waste Management (published 1999).

See also
:Category:Waste management
Planning Policy Statements
Town and country planning in the United Kingdom
Planning and Compulsory Purchase Act 2004
Waste management

Environmental reports
Waste legislation in the United Kingdom
United Kingdom planning policy